The 2nd annual Venice International Film Festival was held between 1 and 20 August 1934. This was the first year the festival had a competition with the Coppa Mussolini being awarded for Best Foreign Film and Best Italian Film.

In-Competition films
 Amok by Fyodor Otsep
 Broken Dreams by Robert G. Vignola
 Ekstase by Gustav Machatý
 It Happened One Night by Frank Capra
 La signora di tutti by Max Ophüls
 Le Grand Jeu by Jacques Feyder
 Little Women by George Cukor
 Man of Aran by Robert J. Flaherty
 Queen Christina by Rouben Mamoulian
 The Private Life of Don Juan by Alexander Korda
 Teresa Confalonieri by Guido Brignone
 Viva Villa! by Jack Conway

Awards
 Best Foreign Film: Man of Aran by Robert J. Flaherty
 Best Italian Film: Teresa Confalonieri by Guido Brignone
 Golden Medal: Stadium by Carlo Campogalliani
 Best Director: Gustav Machatý for Ecstasy
 Best Actor: Wallace Beery for Viva Villa!
 Best Actress: Katharine Hepburn for Little Women
 Best Animation: Walt Disney for Funny Little Bunnies
 Special Recommendation:
 Death Takes a Holiday by Mitchell Leisen
 The Invisible Man by James Whale
 The World Moves On by John Ford
 Viva Villa! by Jack Conway
 Best Short Film: Voulez-vous être un assassin? by Marcel De Hubsch
 Best Cinematography: Dood water by Andor von Barsy
 Special Prize: Seconda B by Goffredo Alessandrini
 Honorary Diploma:
 En stilla flirt by Gustaf Molander
 Leblebici horhor aga by Muhsin Ertuğrul
 Nippon Nippon by Katsudo Shashin
 Se ha fugado un preso by Benito Perojo
 Savitri by C. Pullaiah
 Seeta by Debaki Bose

References

External links 

Venice Film Festival 1934 Awards on IMDb

V
Venice Film Festival
1934 film festivals
Film
August 1934 events